The Brilliance BC3 is a sport compact coupé produced by the joint venture of Brilliance Auto, Mitsubishi Motors, Porsche AG and BMW Group.

Overview

It was originally announced at the Beijing Auto Show in 2006 as the Brilliance Zhonghua M3 then at the Geneva Motor Show in 2007 as the BC3 prototype, the Paris Motor Show in 2008 as the Zhonghua Coupe and at the 2009 Detroit Auto Show as the Brilliance M3. 

The BC3 was designed by Pininfarina, the chassis was developed with assistance from Porsche Engineering and the engine developed with FEV Inc.

Despite the BC3 touring around international motor shows including Geneva, Paris and Detroit, the car is not yet widely exported. It is sold in Egypt as the Brilliance Kouper, in China as the Brilliance M3 and Germany as the "BC3 GT".

Specifications

References

External links
Brilliance M3 website
Road and Track BC3 photo gallery

BC3
Cars introduced in 2007
Cars of China
Sport compact cars
Coupés
Hatchbacks
Front-wheel-drive sports cars
2010s cars